The General Dynamics FIM-43 Redeye is a man-portable surface-to-air missile system. It uses passive infrared homing to track its target. Production began in 1962 andin anticipation of the Redeye II, which later became the FIM-92 Stingerended in the early 1970s (delivery of the last Redeye for the U.S. Army was completed in July 1971) after about 85,000 rounds had been built. The Redeye was withdrawn gradually between 1982 and 1995 as the Stinger was deployed, though it remained in service with various armed forces of the world until quite recently, being supplied via the Foreign Military Sales program. It was initially banned from being sold overseas, to avoid missiles falling into the hands of terrorist organizations. However, after the export ban was lifted, the weapon was never actually used by terrorists against civil aircraft, in contrast with other MANPADS. While the Redeye and 9K32 Strela-2 (SA-7) were similar, the missiles were not identical. Nonetheless, the CIA concluded that the Soviet SA-7 had benefited from the Redeye’s development.

Development
In 1948 the United States Army began seeking new infantry air-defense weapons, as automatic gunfire was ineffective against new fast jets. Several gun/rocket systems were investigated, but none were promising. In the mid-1950s Convair began studies of a man portable infrared guided missile. In November 1956 the results of these studies were shown to the U.S. Army and Marine Corps. In 1957 official requirements were formulated.  Meanwhile, the Convair bid was contested by:
 , a crew-served partially portable surface-to-air missile system, designed by the Drone and Missile Flight Control Department of Sperry Gyroscope, Garden City, New York,
  (Shoulder-Launched Antiaircraft Missile), a man-portable surface-to-air missile system, designed by the Autonetics Division of North American Aviation, Downey, California,
 an undesignated system by Lockheed Missile Systems Division, Sunnyvale, California (Col. James E. Linka, a supervising officer with OCRD Air Defense and Missiles Division, responsible for Stinger, later recalled that Lockheed entered the competition in 1959, but no details were ever disclosed.)
The competing designs were based on various U.S. air-to-air missiles, adapted for ground use and scaled-down to be operated by hand and launched from a disposable tube. Largely because of cost overruns associated with General Dynamic's developments of their own infrared technology, Philco was sub-contracted with a seeker already in production, which was considered a cheaper and more reliable product than General Dynamics-developed prototype devices. The basic Redeye mounted the Philco-developed heat seeker at its homing head, a direct descendant of the AIM-9B Sidewinder missile, using the same uncooled lead sulfide IR detector unit behind an optical lens. The missile choice was affected by budgetary reasons, because rocket motors and other missile sections 2.75 inches in diameter were easier to manufacture by available metalworking machinery and industrial facilities producing folding fin aerial rockets, instead of developing completely new production lines.

Finally, in April 1958, Convair was awarded a contract to start development of the system. In May 1958 six unguided launches were conducted by U.S. Marines at Twentynine Palms proving ground and Camp Pendleton, California, to assess human factors and ergonomics of the new weapon, as well as a trooper's capability to aim and launch a missile from the shoulder safely and accurately towards an imaginary target. In June 1958 the flight test phase of the feasibility demonstration program began.

In July 1959 the development project began, in March 1960, the advanced test rounds were fired. Launches from a launch tube followed in May 1961, with a shoulder launch occurring in 1961. Technical problems prevented the missile entering full production: The missile did not live up to its specifications, being slower, less maneuverable and less accurate. During the testing, substantial use was made of the Atlantic Research MQR-16 Gunrunner expendable target missile.

Deficiencies and shortcomings were experienced during the system development phase -- mainly seeker inability to discriminate target against cloudy background or in a heavy clutter environment, coupled with absence of night operation capability and inability to engage head-on targets -- which were never resolved (eventually leading to the Stinger development). Consequently, several other unsolicited proposals competed with the Redeye in the early 1960s. These included both guided (engaging target using techniques other than infrared homing) and unguided (directionally-controlled) missile systems.

Limited production began as XM41 Redeye Block I. The missile was designated XMIM-43A in June 1963. Block I systems were then evaluated between 1965 and 1966.

Block II systems designated XM41E1 began development in 1964, the missile being designated XMIM-43B. The missiles were delivered in April 1966, and included a new gas-cooled infrared detector cell, a slightly redesigned launcher and an improved warhead.

In 1965 to 1966 General Dynamics developed the final Redeye Block III configuration, designated at first XM41E2 with XFIM-43C missiles. The missiles retained the seeker from the Block II missile, but included a new rocket motor, warhead and fuze. The launcher now had an XM-62 open sight and upgraded electronics. The new missile could turn at up to 3g. The missile achieved a kill probability against F9F tactical drones travelling at 430 knots at an altitude of 100 meters of 0.51. From this it was calculated that the kill probability versus a Mikoyan-Gurevich MiG-21 at similar altitude would be 0.403, and 0.53 against helicopters (specifically the Mil Mi-6 and U.S. H-13 and H-21). Kill probability against larger propeller driven aircraft like the Antonov An-12 was estimated at 0.43. Production of the Block III systems began in May 1967. In 1968 Block III was declared operational.

History
Fifty Redeye systems were delivered to the mujahideen by the United States during the Soviet–Afghan War in 1984, where they were used to shoot down aircraft including several Sukhoi Su-25 jets, as well as Mil Mi-24 and Mi-8 helicopters. By November 1986 it had largely been replaced by the dramatically more successful FIM-92 Stinger missiles.

All Redeye missiles were numbered and inventorized by the U.S. Army Missile Command to prevent them from disappearance or otherwise unnoticed losses. Thanks to that, there were no Redeye missiles reported lost or stolen from the Army inventory, though such losses actually occurred after Redeyes were supplied to foreign troops (happening first in Belgium in January 1974, causing a strengthening of security measures in the major West European and British airports.)

The Redeye was known as Hamlet in Danish service and as RBS 69 in Swedish service.

Redeye missiles provided to the FDN by the U.S. were also used by the Nicaraguan "Contras" to shoot down at least four Soviet Mil Mi-8 helicopters during the Nicaraguan Revolution.

Description
The missile is fired from the M171 missile launcher. First, the seeker is cooled to operating temperature and then the operator begins to visually track the target using the sight unit on the launcher. Once the target is locked onto by the missile, a buzzer in the launcher hand grip begins vibrating, alerting the operator. The operator then presses the trigger, which fires the initial booster stage and launches the missile out of the tube at a speed of around 80 feet per second (25 m/s). As the missile leaves the tube, spring-loaded fins pop out—four stabilizing tail fins at the back of the missile, and two control surfaces at the front of the missile. Once the missile has traveled six meters, the sustainer motor ignites. The sustainer motor takes the missile to its peak velocity of Mach 1.7 in 5.8 seconds. 1.25 seconds after the sustainer is ignited, the warhead is armed.

The missile's  seeker is capable only of acquiring and tracking the hot exhaust of aircraft, which limits the engagements to tail-chase only, tracking the rapidly receding target.  The missile's blast fragmentation warhead is triggered by an impact fuze, requiring a direct hit. As a first-generation missile it is susceptible to countermeasures, including flares and hot brick jammers. Its inability to turn at a rate greater than 3 G means that it can be outmaneuvered, if detected.

Variants

During its development, the weapon underwent several major design changes. Initially, its gripstock was literally just a gripstock with grips, stock and trigger only, later evolved in a separable launch unit with optics, electronics, and battery input. Several designs didn't have optical sighting device at all (gunner was supposed to rely on the instant annoying alarm beep when seeker acquired the target,) while those which have it differed one from another with shape, field of view and magnification of their optics, either separable, or non-separable, which in turn could be built-in or molded-in primitive mechanical sight with flashing diodes inside diopter to inform gunner of seeker's lock-on. Launch tube changed its design and shape several times, from pipelike straight-shaped one to the variable-diameter tube with wide rear section to provide missile with better acceleration, and back to straightline tube to prevent its explosion due to a critical pressure drop or accidental booster detonation. Canards of the basic missile design were housed within the missile body during the entire flight, coming outside only to correct the course deviation of each roll cycle and folding back within a split second, variable incidence (instead of fixed) canards were used to improve terminal guidance accuracy. Seeker also have changed drastically, with multiple modifications made during the test phase, most important of which, it became cooled, thus increasing its discrimination capability (though extending reaction time a little bit in order to adjust its subsystems to operating temperature,) and reducing the field of view to increase missile's capability against single engine jets, to become more reliable and efficient weapon. Among the design improvements made in the seeker gyro were an increased aperture to provide greater sensitivity; a new center post design for supporting the secondary mirror to improve background discrimination; a new gyro gimbal of increased rigidity; an improved lead sulfide cell, doubling its sensitivity; and an improved reticle with a reduced field of view. Unorthodox designs included the "Foxhole Redeye," being almost a half shorter and small enough to be stored and fired from a rifleman's foxhole, and the "unitized launcher Redeye" fire-and-discard variant as a fully discardable throw-away unit with no separable elements for use with the USMC and CONARC units. All interim designs eventually were dropped in favour of the one which was considered the best possible choice by the Army Missile Command, and mass-produced at the General Dynamics facilities within the Greater Los Angeles Area. The following is the list, featuring the basic model, designated FIM-43A and approved for production along with its derivatives:
 Block I FIM-43/XFIM-43A/XMIM-43A
 Block II FIM-43B/XFIM-43B/XMIM-43B – Fitted with a gas cooled seeker and improved warhead and fuse and modified launcher.
 XFEM-43B – Experimental missile, with data logging capability
 Block III FIM-43C/XFIM-43C – Production version; improved warhead and fuse section, and a new launcher.
 XFEM-43C – Experimental missile, with data logging capability
 FIM-43D – Upgraded missile, with unknown capabilities.

Comparison chart

Operators

Former operators
Sources:

States

Groups
Afghan Mujahideen
 FAN
Contra Guerrillas

See also
 List of U.S. Army rocket launchers by model number 
 SA-7 Grail
 Anza
 Misagh-2
 Qaem

References

Sources cited
 Cagle, Mary T. History of the Redeye Weapon System, Redstone Arsenal, Ala., U.S. Army Missile Command, Histcrical Division, 1975.

External links
 General Dynamics FIM-43 Redeye - Designation Systems

Cold War surface-to-air missiles of the United States
Naval surface-to-air missiles of the United States
Military equipment introduced in the 1960s